The Lempel–Ziv–Markov chain algorithm (LZMA) is an algorithm used to perform lossless data compression. It has been under development since either 1996 or 1998 by Igor Pavlov and was first used in the 7z format of the 7-Zip archiver. This algorithm uses a dictionary compression scheme somewhat similar to the LZ77 algorithm published by Abraham Lempel and Jacob Ziv in 1977 and features a high compression ratio (generally higher than bzip2) and a variable compression-dictionary size (up to 4 GB), while still maintaining decompression speed similar to other commonly used compression algorithms.

LZMA2 is a simple container format that can include both uncompressed data and LZMA data, possibly with multiple different LZMA encoding parameters.  LZMA2 supports arbitrarily scalable multithreaded compression and decompression and efficient compression of data which is partially incompressible.

Overview
LZMA uses a dictionary compression algorithm (a variant of LZ77 with huge dictionary sizes and special support for repeatedly used match distances), whose output is then encoded with a range encoder, using a complex model to make a probability prediction of each bit.  The dictionary compressor finds matches using sophisticated dictionary data structures, and produces a stream of literal symbols and phrase references, which is encoded one bit at a time by the range encoder: many encodings are possible, and a dynamic programming algorithm is used to select an optimal one under certain approximations.

Prior to LZMA, most encoder models were purely byte-based (i.e. they coded each bit using only a cascade of contexts to represent the dependencies on previous bits from the same byte).  The main innovation of LZMA is that instead of a generic byte-based model, LZMA's model uses contexts specific to the bitfields in each representation of a literal or phrase: this is nearly as simple as a generic byte-based model, but gives much better compression because it avoids mixing unrelated bits together in the same context. Furthermore, compared to classic dictionary compression (such as the one used in zip and gzip formats), the dictionary sizes can be and usually are much larger, taking advantage of the large amount of memory available on modern systems.

Compressed format overview
In LZMA compression, the compressed stream is a stream of bits, encoded using an adaptive binary range coder. The stream is divided into packets, each packet describing either a single byte, or an LZ77 sequence with its length and distance implicitly or explicitly encoded.  Each part of each packet is modeled with independent contexts, so the probability predictions for each bit are correlated with the values of that bit (and related bits from the same field) in previous packets of the same type. Both the lzip and the LZMA SDK documentation describes this stream format.

There are 7 types of packets:

LONGREP[*] refers to LONGREP[0-3] packets, *REP refers to both LONGREP and SHORTREP, and *MATCH refers to both MATCH and *REP.

LONGREP[n] packets remove the distance used from the list of the most recent distances and reinsert it at the front, to avoid useless repeated entry, while MATCH just adds the distance to the front even if already present in the list and SHORTREP and LONGREP[0] don't alter the list.

The length is encoded as follows:

As in LZ77, the length is not limited by the distance, because copying from the dictionary is defined as if the copy was performed byte by byte, keeping the distance constant.

Distances are logically 32-bit and distance 0 points to the most recently added byte in the dictionary.

The distance encoding starts with a 6-bit "distance slot", which determines how many further bits are needed.
Distances are decoded as a binary concatenation of, from most to least significant, two bits depending on the distance slot, some bits encoded with fixed 0.5 probability, and some context encoded bits, according to the following table (distance slots 0−3 directly encode distances 0−3).

Decompression algorithm details

No complete natural language specification of the compressed format seems to exist, other than the one attempted in the following text.

The description below is based on the compact XZ Embedded decoder by Lasse Collin included in the Linux kernel source from which the LZMA and LZMA2 algorithm details can be relatively easily deduced: thus, while citing source code as reference is not ideal, any programmer should be able to check the claims below with a few hours of work.

Range coding of bits

LZMA data is at the lowest level decoded one bit at a time by the range decoder, at the direction of the LZMA decoder.

Fixed probability range decoding instead assumes a 0.5 probability, but operates slightly differently from context-based range decoding.

The range decoder state consists of two unsigned 32-bit variables, range (representing the range size), and code (representing the encoded point within the range).

Normalization proceeds in this way:
 Shift both range and code left by 8 bits
 Read a byte from the compressed stream
 Set the least significant 8 bits of code to the byte value read

Context-based range decoding of a bit using the prob probability variable proceeds in this way:
 Set bound to 
 If code is less than bound:
 Set range to bound
 Set prob to prob + 
 Return bit 0
 Otherwise (if code is greater than or equal to the bound):
 Set range to range − bound
 Set code to code − bound
 Set prob to 
 Return bit 1

Fixed-probability range decoding of a bit proceeds in this way:
 Set range to 
 If code is less than range:
 Return bit 0
 Otherwise (if code is greater or equal than range):
 Set code to code − range
 Return bit 1

The Linux kernel implementation of fixed-probability decoding in rc_direct(), for performance reasons, does not include a conditional branch, but instead subtracts range from code unconditionally. The resulting sign bit is used to both decide the bit to return and to generate a mask that is combined with code and added to range.

Note that:
 The division by  when computing bound and floor operation is done before the multiplication, not after (apparently to avoid requiring fast hardware support for 32-bit multiplication with a 64-bit result)
 Fixed probability decoding is not strictly equivalent to context-based range decoding with any prob value, due to the fact that context-based range decoding discards the lower 11 bits of range before multiplying by prob as just described, while fixed probability decoding only discards the last bit

Range coding of integers 

The range decoder also provides the bit-tree, reverse bit-tree and fixed probability integer decoding facilities, which are used to decode integers, and generalize the single-bit decoding described above.
To decode unsigned integers less than limit, an array of  11-bit probability variables is provided, which are conceptually arranged as the internal nodes of a complete binary tree with limit leaves.

Non-reverse bit-tree decoding works by keeping a pointer to the tree of variables, which starts at the root. As long as the pointer does not point to a leaf, a bit is decoded using the variable indicated by the pointer, and the pointer is moved to either the left or right children depending on whether the bit is 0 or 1; when the pointer points to a leaf, the number associated with the leaf is returned.

Non-reverse bit-tree decoding thus happens from most significant to least significant bit, stopping when only one value in the valid range is possible (this conceptually allows to have range sizes that are not powers of two, even though LZMA does not make use of this).

Reverse bit-tree decoding instead decodes from least significant bit to most significant bits, and thus only supports ranges that are powers of two, and always decodes the same number of bits. It is equivalent to performing non-reverse bittree decoding with a power of two limit, and reversing the last  bits of the result.

In the  function in the Linux kernel, integers are actually returned in the  range (with limit added to the conceptual value), and the variable at index 0 in the array is unused, while the one at index 1 is the root, and the left and right children indices are computed as 2i and 2i + 1. The  function instead adds integers in the  range to a caller-provided variable, where limit is implicitly represented by its logarithm, and has its own independent implementation for efficiency reasons.

Fixed probability integer decoding simply performs fixed probability bit decoding repeatedly, reading bits from the most to the least significant.

LZMA configuration
The LZMA decoder is configured by an  "properties" byte and a dictionary size.
lc is the number of high bits of the previous byte to use as a context for literal encoding (the default value used by the LZMA SDK is 3)

In non-LZMA2 streams, lc must not be greater than 8, and lp and pb must not be greater than 4.
In LZMA2 streams,  and pb must not be greater than 4.

In the 7-zip LZMA file format, configuration is performed by a header containing the "properties" byte followed by the 32-bit little-endian dictionary size in bytes. In LZMA2, the properties byte can optionally be changed at the start of LZMA2 LZMA packets, while the dictionary size is specified in the LZMA2 header as later described.

LZMA coding contexts

The LZMA packet format has already been described, and this section specifies how LZMA statistically models the LZ-encoded streams, or in other words which probability variables are passed to the range decoder to decode each bit.

Those probability variables are implemented as multi-dimensional arrays; before introducing them, a few values that are used as indices in these multidimensional arrays are defined.

The state value is conceptually based on which of the patterns in the following table match the latest 2-4 packet types seen, and is implemented as a state machine state updated according to the transition table listed in the table every time a packet is output.

The initial state is 0, and thus packets before the beginning are assumed to be LIT packets.

The pos_state and literal_pos_state values consist of respectively the pb and lp (up to 4, from the LZMA header or LZMA2 properties packet) least significant bits of the dictionary position (the number of bytes coded since the last dictionary reset modulo the dictionary size). Note that the dictionary size is normally the multiple of a large power of 2, so these values are equivalently described as the least significant bits of the number of uncompressed bytes seen since the last dictionary reset.

The prev_byte_lc_msbs value is set to the lc (up to 4, from the LZMA header or LZMA2 properties packet) most significant bits of the previous uncompressed byte.

The is_REP value denotes whether a packet that includes a length is a LONGREP rather than a MATCH.

The match_byte value is the byte that would have been decoded if a SHORTREP packet had been used (in other words, the byte found at the dictionary at the last used distance); it is only used just after a *MATCH packet.

literal_bit_mode is an array of 8 values in the 0-2 range, one for each bit position in a byte, which are 1 or 2 if the previous packet was a *MATCH and it is either the most significant bit position or all the more significant bits in the literal to encode/decode are equal to the bits in the corresponding positions in match_byte, while otherwise it is 0; the choice between the 1 or 2 values depends on the value of the bit at the same position in match_byte.

The literal/Literal set of variables can be seen as a "pseudo-bit-tree" similar to a bit-tree but with 3 variables instead of 1 in every node, chosen depending on the literal_bit_mode value at the bit position of the next bit to decode after the bit-tree context denoted by the node.

The claim, found in some sources, that literals after a *MATCH are coded as the XOR of the byte value with match_byte is incorrect; they are instead coded simply as their byte value, but using the pseudo-bit-tree just described and the additional context listed in the table below.

The probability variable groups used in LZMA are those:

LZMA2 format
The LZMA2 container supports multiple runs of compressed LZMA data and uncompressed data. Each LZMA compressed run can have a different LZMA configuration and dictionary. This improves the compression of partially or completely incompressible files and allows multithreaded compression and multithreaded decompression by breaking the file into runs that can be compressed or decompressed independently in parallel.
Criticism of LZMA2's changes over LZMA include header fields not being covered by CRCs,
and parallel decompression not being possible in practice.

The LZMA2 header consists of a byte indicating the dictionary size:
 40 indicates a 4 GB − 1 dictionary size
 Even values less than 40 indicate a 2v/2 + 12 bytes dictionary size
 Odd values less than 40 indicate a 3×2(v − 1)/2 + 11 bytes dictionary size
 Values higher than 40 are invalid

LZMA2 data consists of packets starting with a control byte, with the following values:
 0 denotes the end of the file
 1 denotes a dictionary reset followed by an uncompressed chunk
 2 denotes an uncompressed chunk without a dictionary reset
 3-0x7f are invalid values
 0x80-0xff denotes an LZMA chunk, where the lowest 5 bits are used as bit 16-20 of the uncompressed size minus one, and bit 5-6 indicates what should be reset

Bits 5-6 for LZMA chunks can be:
 0: nothing reset
 1: state reset
 2: state reset, properties reset using properties byte
 3: state reset,  properties reset using properties byte, dictionary reset

LZMA state resets cause a reset of all LZMA state except the dictionary, and specifically:
 The range coder
 The state value
 The last distances for repeated matches
 All LZMA probabilities

Uncompressed chunks consist of:
 A 16-bit big-endian value encoding the data size minus one
 The data to be copied verbatim into the dictionary and the output

LZMA chunks consist of:
 A 16-bit big-endian value encoding the low 16-bits of the uncompressed size minus one
 A 16-bit big-endian value encoding the compressed size minus one
 A properties/lclppb byte if bit 6 in the control byte is set
 The LZMA compressed data, starting with the 5 bytes (of which the first is ignored) used to initialize the range coder (which are included in the compressed size)

xz and 7z formats

The .xz format, which can contain LZMA2 data, is documented at tukaani.org, while the .7z file format, which can contain either LZMA or LZMA2 data, is documented in the 7zformat.txt file contained in the LZMA SDK.

Compression algorithm details
Similar to the decompression format situation, no complete natural language specification of the encoding techniques in 7-zip or xz seems to exist, other than the one attempted in the following text.

The description below is based on the XZ for Java encoder by Lasse Collin, which appears to be the most readable among several rewrites of the original 7-zip using the same algorithms: again, while citing source code as reference is not ideal, any programmer should be able to check the claims below with a few hours of work.

Range encoder
The range encoder cannot make any interesting choices, and can be readily constructed based on the decoder description.

Initialization and termination are not fully determined; the xz encoder outputs 0 as the first byte which is ignored by the decompressor, and encodes the lower bound of the range (which matters for the final bytes).

The xz encoder uses an unsigned 33-bit variable called low (typically implemented as a 64-bit integer, initialized to 0), an unsigned 32-bit variable called range (initialized to ), an unsigned 8-bit variable called cache (initialized to 0), and an unsigned variable called cache_size which needs to be large enough to store the uncompressed size (initialized to 1, typically implemented as a 64-bit integer).

The cache/cache_size variables are used to properly handle carries, and represent a number defined by a big-endian sequence starting with the cache value, and followed by cache_size 0xff bytes, which has been shifted out of the low register, but has not been written yet, because it could be incremented by one due to a carry.

Note that the first byte output will always be 0 due to the fact that cache and low are initialized to 0, and the encoder implementation; the xz decoder ignores this byte.

Normalization proceeds in this way:
 If low is less than :
 Output the byte stored in cache to the compressed stream
 Output cache_size − 1 bytes with 0xff value
 Set cache to bits 24-31 of low
 Set cache_size to 0
 If low is greater or equal than :
 Output the byte stored in cache plus one to the compressed stream
 Output cache_size − 1 bytes with 0 value
 Set cache to bits 24-31 of low
 Set cache_size to 0
 Increment cache_size
 Set low to the lowest 24 bits of low shifted left by 8 bits
 Set range to range shifted left by 8 bits

Context-based range encoding of a bit using the prob probability variable proceeds in this way:
 Set bound to 
 If encoding a 0 bit:
 Set range to bound
 Set prob to 
 Otherwise (if encoding a 1 bit):
 Set range to range − bound
 Set low to low + bound
 Set prob to 

Fixed-probability range encoding of a bit proceeds in this way:
 Set range to 
 If encoding a 1 bit:
 Set low to low + range

Termination proceeds this way:
 Perform normalization 5 times

Bit-tree encoding is performed like decoding, except that bit values are taken from the input integer to be encoded rather than from the result of the bit decoding functions.

For algorithms that try to compute the encoding with the shortest post-range-encoding size, the encoder also needs to provide an estimate of that.

Dictionary search data structures
The encoder needs to be able to quickly locate matches in the dictionary. Since LZMA uses very large dictionaries (potentially on the order of gigabytes) to improve compression, simply scanning the whole dictionary would result in an encoder too slow to be practically usable, so sophisticated data structures are needed to support fast match searches.

Hash chains
The simplest approach, called "hash chains", is parameterized by a constant N which can be either 2, 3 or 4, which is typically chosen so that  is greater than or equal to the dictionary size.

It consists of creating, for each k less than or equal to N, a hash table indexed by tuples of k bytes, where each of the buckets contains the last position where the first k bytes hashed to the hash value associated with that hash table bucket.

Chaining is achieved by an additional array which stores, for every dictionary position, the last seen previous position whose first N bytes hash to the same value of the first N bytes of the position in question.

To find matches of length N or higher, a search is started using the N-sized hash table, and continued using the hash chain array; the search stop after a pre-defined number of hash chain nodes has been traversed, or when the hash chains "wraps around", indicating that the portion of the input that has been overwritten in the dictionary has been reached.

Matches of size less than N are instead found by simply looking at the corresponding hash table, which either contains the latest such match, if any, or a string that hashes to the same value; in the latter case, the encoder will not be able to find the match.
This issue is mitigated by the fact that for distant short matches using multiple literals might require less bits, and having hash conflicts in nearby strings is relatively unlikely; using larger hash tables or even direct lookup tables can reduce the problem at the cost of higher cache miss rate and thus lower performance.

Note that all matches need to be validated to check that the actual bytes match currently at that specific dictionary position match, since the hashing mechanism only guarantees that at some past time there were characters hashing to the hash table bucket index (some implementations may not even guarantee that, because they do not initialize the data structures).

LZMA uses Markov chains, as implied by "M" in its name.

Binary trees
The binary tree approach follows the hash chain approach, except that it logically uses a binary tree instead of a linked list for chaining.

The binary tree is maintained so that it is always both a search tree relative to the suffix lexicographic ordering, and a max-heap for the dictionary position (in other words, the root is always the most recent string, and a child cannot have been added more recently than its parent): assuming all strings are lexicographically ordered, these conditions clearly uniquely determine the binary tree (this is trivially provable by induction on the size of the tree).

Since the string to search for and the string to insert are the same, it is possible to perform both dictionary search and insertion (which requires to rotate the tree) in a single tree traversal.

Patricia tries
Some old LZMA encoders also supported a data structure based on Patricia tries, but such support has since been dropped since it was deemed inferior to the other options.

LZMA encoder
LZMA encoders can freely decide which match to output, or whether to ignore the presence of matches and output literals anyway.

The ability to recall the 4 most recently used distances means that, in principle, using a match with a distance that will be needed again later may be globally optimal even if it is not locally optimal, and as a result of this, optimal LZMA compression probably requires knowledge of the whole input and might require algorithms too slow to be usable in practice.

Due to this, practical implementations tend to employ non-global heuristics.

The xz encoders use a value called nice_len (the default is 64): when any match of length at least nice_len is found, the encoder stops the search and outputs it, with the maximum matching length.

Fast encoder
The XZ fast encoder (derived from the 7-zip fast encoder) is the shortest LZMA encoder in the xz source tree.

It works like this:
 Perform combined search and insertion in the dictionary data structure
 If any repeated distance matches with length at least nice_len:
 Output the most frequently used such distance with a REP packet
 If a match was found of length at least nice_len:
 Output it with a MATCH packet
 Set the main match to the longest match
 Look at the nearest match of every length in decreasing length order, and until no replacement can be made:
 Replace the main match with a match which is one character shorter, but whose distance is less than 1/128 the current main match distance
 Set the main match length to 1 if the current main match is of length 2 and distance at least 128
 If a repeated match was found, and it is shorter by at most 1 character than the main match:
 Output the repeated match with a REP packet
 If a repeated match was found, and it is shorter by at most 2 characters than the main match, and the main match distance is at least 512:
 Output the repeated match with a REP packet
 If a repeated match was found, and it is shorter by at most 3 characters than the main match, and the main match distance is at least 32768:
 Output the repeated match with a REP packet
 If the main match size is less than 2 (or there is not any match):
 Output a LIT packet
 Perform a dictionary search for the next byte
 If the next byte is shorter by at most 1 character than the main match, with distance less than 1/128 times the main match distance, and if the main match length is at least 3:
 Output a LIT packet
 If the next byte has a match at least as long as the main match, and with less distance than the main match:
 Output a LIT packet
 If the next byte has a match at least one character longer than the main match, and such that 1/128 of its distance is less or equal than the main match distance:
 Output a LIT packet
 If the next byte has a match more than one character longer than the main match:
 Output a LIT packet
 If any repeated match is shorter by at most 1 character than the main match:
 Output the most frequently used such distance with a REP packet
 Output the main match with a MATCH packet

Normal encoder
The XZ normal encoder (derived from the 7-zip normal encoder) is the other LZMA encoder in the xz source tree, which adopts a more sophisticated approach that tries to minimize the post-range-encoding size of the generated packets.

Specifically, it encodes portions of the input using the result of a dynamic programming algorithm, where the subproblems are finding the approximately optimal encoding (the one with minimal post-range-encoding size) of the substring of length L starting at the byte being compressed.

The size of the portion of the input processed in the dynamic programming algorithm is determined to be the maximum between the longest dictionary match and the longest repeated match found at the start position (which is capped by the maximum LZMA match length, 273); furthermore, if a match longer than nice_len is found at any point in the range just defined, the dynamic programming algorithm stops, the solution for the subproblem up to that point is output, the nice_len-sized match is output, and a new dynamic programming problem instance is started at the byte after the match is output.

Subproblem candidate solutions are incrementally updated with candidate encodings, constructed taking the solution for a shorter substring of length L', extended with all possible "tails", or sets of 1-3 packets with certain constraints that encode the input at the L' position. Once the final solution of a subproblem is found, the LZMA state and least used distances for it are computed, and are then used to appropriately compute post-range-encoding sizes of its extensions.

At the end of the dynamic programming optimization, the whole optimal encoding of the longest substring considered is output, and encoding continues at the first uncompressed byte not already encoded, after updating the LZMA state and least used distances.

Each subproblem is extended by a packet sequence which we call "tail", which must match one of the following patterns:

The reason for not only extending with single packets is that subproblems only have the substring length as the parameter for performance and algorithmic complexity reasons, while an optimal dynamic programming approach would also require to have the last used distances and LZMA state as parameter; thus, extending with multiple packets allows to better approximate the optimal solution, and specifically to make better use of LONGREP[0] packets.

The following data is stored for each subproblem (of course, the values stored are for the candidate solution with minimum price), where by "tail" we refer to the packets extending the solution of the smaller subproblem, which are described directly in the following structure:

Note that in the XZ for Java implementation, the optPrev and backPrev members are reused to store a forward single-linked list of packets as part of outputting the final solution.

LZMA2 encoder

The XZ LZMA2 encoder processes the input in chunks (of up to 2 MB uncompressed size or 64 KB compressed size, whichever is lower), handing each chunk to the LZMA encoder, and then deciding whether to output an LZMA2 LZMA chunk including the encoded data, or to output an LZMA2 uncompressed chunk, depending on which is shorter (LZMA, like any other compressor, will necessarily expand rather than compress some kinds of data).

The LZMA state is reset only in the first block, if the caller requests a change of properties and every time a compressed chunk is output. The LZMA properties are changed only in the first block, or if the caller requests a change of properties.
The dictionary is only reset in the first block.

Upper encoding layers
Before LZMA2 encoding, depending on the options provided, xz can apply the BCJ filter, which filters executable code to replace relative offsets with absolute ones that are more repetitive, or the delta filter, which replaces each byte with the difference between it and the byte  bytes before it.

Parallel encoding is performed by dividing the file in chunks which are distributed to threads, and ultimately each encoded (using, for instance, xz block encoding) separately, resulting in a dictionary reset between chunks in the output file.

7-Zip reference implementation
The LZMA implementation extracted from 7-Zip is available as LZMA SDK. It was originally dual-licensed under both the GNU LGPL and Common Public License, with an additional special exception for linked binaries, but was placed by Igor Pavlov in the public domain on December 2, 2008, with the release of version 4.62.

LZMA2 compression, which is an improved version of LZMA, is now the default compression method for the .7z format, starting with version 9.30 on October 26, 2012.

The reference open source LZMA compression library was originally written in C++ but has been ported to ANSI C, C#, and Java. There are also third-party Python bindings for the C++ library, as well as ports of LZMA to Pascal, Go and Ada.

The 7-Zip implementation uses several variants of hash chains, binary trees and Patricia trees as the basis for its dictionary search algorithm.

In addition to LZMA, the SDK and 7-Zip also implements multiple preprocessing filters intended to improve compression, ranging from simple delta encoding (for images) and BCJ for executable code. It also provides some other compression algorithms used in 7z.

Decompression-only code for LZMA generally compiles to around 5 KB, and the amount of RAM required during decompression is principally determined by the size of the sliding window used during compression. Small code size and relatively low memory overhead, particularly with smaller dictionary lengths, and free source code make the LZMA decompression algorithm well-suited to embedded applications.

Other implementations
In addition to the 7-Zip reference implementation, the following support the LZMA format.
 xz: a streaming implementation that contains a gzip-like command line tool, supporting both LZMA and LZMA2 in its xz file format. It made its way into several software of the Unix-like world with its high performance (compared to bzip2) and small size (compared to gzip). The Linux kernel, dpkg and RPM systems contains xz code, and many software distributors like kernel.org, Debian and Fedora now use xz for compressing their releases.
 lzip: another LZMA implementation mostly for Unix-like systems to be directly competing with xz. It mainly features a simpler file format and therefore easier error recovery.
 ZIPX: an extension to the ZIP compressions format that was created by WinZip starting with version 12.1.  It also can use various other compression methods such as BZip and PPMd.

LZHAM
LZHAM (LZ, Huffman, Arithmetic, Markov), is an LZMA-like implementation that trades compression throughput for very high ratios and higher decompression throughput. It was placed by its author in the public domain on 15 September 2020.

References

External links
 Official home page
 Lzip format specification
 XZ format specification
 LZMA SDK (Software Development Kit)
 LZMA Utils = XZ Utils
 Windows Binaries for XZ Utils
 Data compression, Compressors & Archivers

Lossless compression algorithms
Israeli inventions